The String Quartet No. 2 in E minor, Op. 17, by Henrique Oswald belongs to the most prolific years of his Italian period (1890s). It used to be known under the title Quarteto Brasileiro (The Brazilian Quartet).

Structure 
The quartet is in four movements:

I. Allegro agitato
II. Lento / Adagietto
III. Scherzo / Presto
IV. Molto allegro

Recordings 
 (1971) Heitor Villa-Lobos: Quarteto No. 16; Henrique Oswald: Quarteto Brasileiro – Quarteto Brasileiro da UFRJ – CBS 160174 (LP)
 Reissued on CD: Boccherini, Siquera, Henrique Oswald, Villa-Lobos – Quarteto Brasileiro da UFRJ – ?? (CD)
 (2010/2011) Henrique Oswald: Música de câmara (Integral dos quartetos de cordas; Integral dos quartetos com piano; Quinteto com piano Op. 18; Trio com piano Op. 45; Sonata-Fantasia Op. 44; Elegia para cello e piano) – ArsBrasil (violin: Artur Roberto Huf, Samuel Lima; viola: André Rodrigues, Valdeci Merquiori; cello: Gêneses Oliveira, Mauro Brucoli, Renato Oliveira), Fernando Lopes (piano) – Ariah Cultural  (3 CDs)

References 

Compositions by Henrique Oswald
Oswald, Henrique
Compositions in E minor